Masdevallia coccinea, the little flag, is a species of orchid occurring at high altitudes in the Eastern Cordillera of Colombia.

Synonyms 
Masdevallia coccinea var. conchiflora H.J. Veitch
Masdevallia coccinea var. harryana (Rchb.f.) H.J. Veitch
Masdevallia coccinea var. lindenii Stein
Masdevallia coccinea var. militaris (Rchb.f. & Warsz.) O. Gruss & M. Wolff
Masdevallia denisonii Dombrain
Masdevallia harryana Rchb.f.
Masdevallia harryana var. atrosanguinea B.S. Williams & T. Moore
Masdevallia harryana var. decora B.S. Williams
Masdevallia harryana var. miniata B.S. Williams & T. Moore
Masdevallia lindenii André
Masdevallia lindenii var. grandiflora L. Linden & Rodigas
Masdevallia lindenii var. harryana (Rchb.f.) André
Masdevallia militaris Rchb.f. & Warsz.

References

External links 

coccinea
Endemic orchids of Colombia